XHQL-FM is a radio station on 91.7 FM in Zamora, Michoacán. It is owned by Grupo Radio Zamora and is known as La Catedral de la Música.

History
XEQL-AM received its concession on October 15, 1969. It was owned by Fernando Jiménez Torres until 1964 and broadcast with 1,000 watts on 1580 kHz.

In the early 2000s, XEQL moved to 1260 kHz and increased nighttime power from 250 to 1,000 watts.

XEQL received approval to migrate to FM in 2011.

References

Radio stations in Michoacán